The Price of Progression is the third full-length album from New Jersey, U.S. band Ensign. It follows on from the 1999 release of Cast the First Stone and was recorded in November - December 2000 for an April 2001 release on Indecision Records.

Overview
Ensign had emerged from a period of personnel turmoil to record this album and it was left to the bassist and main songwriter, Nate Gluck, to also take up the job of the guitarwork. The result was a more refined offering which moved sufficiently away from hardcore punk to be recognised in the same circle as some metalcore bands while still retaining the theatrical restraint and lyrical ethics of the hardcore genre. The songs were still short, although many were nearer the three-minute mark than ever before – resulting in the band's longest album ever – but they had more structure and melodic elements than material on either Cast the First Stone or Direction of Things to Come.

Track listing
 All songs written by Ensign
"The Spark" – 2:03
"Black Clouds vs. Silver Linings" – 2:16
"While The Iron Is Hot" – 2:52
"Lesser Of Two" – 1:45
"Absolute Zero" – 0:34
"Grasping At Straws" – 2:31
"Foot In Mouth As An Artform" – 2:55
"Everything You Ever Love" – 2:49
"Slow Burn" – 3:58
"Never Go Home Again" – 2:31
"How To Bleed" – 1:33
"The May Conspiracy" – 1:46
"33" – 2:29
"Cast In Shadows" – 2:15
"Stay Warm" – 2:02
"Sworntosecrecy" – 1:37
"File Under Misunderstood" – 2:05

 Track 10 is a reprise of a track which previously appeared on the Death By Stereo/Ensign Split 7" (EP) recorded in June, 2000 and released by Indecision Records in December, 2000
 Track 13 is suffixed by 47 seconds of strange sound effects before the next track starts

Credits
 Tim Shaw – vocals
 Nate "Edge" Gluck – guitar, bass
 Chris Byrnes – guitar
 John "Vince Vegas" O'Neill – drums
 Good Riddance's Russ Rankin – guest vocals on "Foot In Mouth As An Artform"
 Kill Your Idol's Andy West – guest vocals on "Stay Warm"
 Recorded November 20 – December 15, 2000 at Trax East, South River, New Jersey, USA
 Produced by Eric Rachel and Nate Gluck
 Engineered and mixed by Eric Rachel
 Mastered by Alan Douches at West West Side Music, New Jersey
 Producer, Eric Rachel played bass in rehearsals for "Cast In Shadows"
 Chris Oliver played bass in rehearsals while Nate Gluck recorded the guitar track

References

External links
 Nitro Records
 Indecision Records

2001 albums
Ensign (band) albums